Albin Mörfelt (born 10 January 2000) is a Swedish football midfielder who plays for Mjällby, on loan from  Vålerenga.

Mörfelt has a Norwegian father, and was called up to a Norway national under-21 football team training camp in May 2021.

References

2000 births
Living people
Swedish people of Norwegian descent
Swedish footballers
Association football midfielders
Vasalunds IF players
IK Frej players
Varbergs BoIS players
Vålerenga Fotball players
Ettan Fotboll players
Allsvenskan players
Eliteserien players
Swedish expatriate footballers
Expatriate footballers in Norway
Swedish expatriate sportspeople in Norway
Footballers from Stockholm